The 1994 WDF Europe Cup was the 9th edition of the WDF Europe Cup darts tournament, organised by the World Darts Federation. It was held in Stockholm, Sweden from 13 to 15 October.



Entered teams

21 countries/associations entered a men's selection in the event.

18 countries/associations entered a woman's selection in the event.

Men's singles

Men's Pairs

Men's team
Round Robin 

Group A

 England 9 - 6  Norway
 England 9 - 3  Switzerland
 England 9 - 1  Cyprus
 England 9 - 1  Czech Republic 
 Norway 9 - 7  Switzerland
 Norway 9 - 2  Cyprus
 Norway 9 - 0  Czech Republic
 Switzerland 9 - 2  Cyprus
 Switzerland 9 - 6  Czech Republic
 Cyprus 9 - 8  Czech Republic

Group B

 Northern Ireland 9 - 7  Scotland
 Northern Ireland 9 - 2  France 
 Northern Ireland 9 - 0  Greece
 Northern Ireland 9 - 1  Latvia
 Scotland 9 - 4  France 
 Scotland 9 - 2  Greece 
 Scotland 9 - 0  Latvia
 France 9 - 2  Greece 
 France 9 - 1  Latvia
 Greece 9 - 5  Latvia

Group C

 Wales 9 - 6  Belgium 
 Wales 9 - 4  Sweden 
 Wales 9 - 0  Italy
 Wales 9 - 0  Russia
 Belgium 9 - 8  Sweden  
 Belgium 9 - 2  Italy
 Belgium 9 - 3  Russia 
 Sweden 9 - 3  Italy
 Sweden 9 - 7  Russia
 Italy 9 - 3  Russia

Group D

 Netherlands 9 - 2  Ireland
 Netherlands 9 - 8  Finland
 Netherlands 9 - 3  Germany
 Denmark 9 - 8  Netherlands
 Denmark 9 - 5  Finland
 Denmark 9 - 4  Germany
 Ireland 9 - 7  Denmark
 Ireland 9 - 4  Germany
 Finland 9 - 3  Ireland
 Germany 9 - 8  Finland 

Knock Out

Woman's singles

Woman's Pairs
Round Robin 

Group A

 Leeanne Maddock & Sandra Greatbatch 4 - 2  Cathie Gibson-McCulloch & Janette Youngson
 Leeanne Maddock & Sandra Greatbatch 4 - 1  Monica Zago & Nadia Moschion
 Leeanne Maddock & Sandra Greatbatch 4 - 0  Nadedja Boltatch & Galina Gubina
 Cathie Gibson-McCulloch & Janette Youngson 4 - 1  Monica Zago & Nadia Moschion
 Cathie Gibson-McCulloch & Janette Youngson 4 - 1  Nadedja Boltatch & Galina Gubina
 Monica Zago & Nadia Moschion 4 - 1  Nadedja Boltatch & Galina Gubina

Group B

 Valerie Maytum & Francis Hoenselaar 4 - 2  Gerda Søgaard-Weltz & Ann-Louise Peters
 Valerie Maytum & Francis Hoenselaar 4 - 0  Andrea Tanner & Barbara Pfister
 Valerie Maytum & Francis Hoenselaar 4 - 0  Maria Novikova & Marina Tsariova
 Gerda Søgaard-Weltz & Ann-Louise Peters 4 - 1  Andrea Tanner & Barbara Pfister
 Gerda Søgaard-Weltz & Ann-Louise Peters 4 - 0  Maria Novikova & Marina Tsariova
 Andrea Tanner & Barbara Pfister 4 - 1  Maria Novikova & Marina Tsariova

Group C

 Heike Ernst & Gaby Kosuch 4 - 2  Ewa Berg & Kristina Korpii
 Heike Ernst & Gaby Kosuch 4 - 3  Karin Nordahl & Mette Engen-Hansen
 Heike Ernst & Gaby Kosuch 4 - 2  Rhonda Henry & Norma Irvine
 Heike Ernst & Gaby Kosuch 4 - 1  Josiane Lefebre & Sophie Flieler     
 Ewa Berg & Kristina Korpii 4 - 3  Karin Nordahl & Mette Engen-Hansen 
 Ewa Berg & Kristina Korpii 4 - 0  Rhonda Henry & Norma Irvine
 Ewa Berg & Kristina Korpii 4 - 1  Josiane Lefebre & Sophie Flieler   
 Karin Nordahl & Mette Engen-Hansen 4 - 1  Rhonda Henry & Norma Irvine  
 Rhonda Henry & Norma Irvine 4 - 1  Josiane Lefebre & Sophie Flieler
 Josiane Lefebre & Sophie Flieler 4 - 3  Karin Nordahl & Mette Engen-Hansen   
Group D

 Tammy Montgomery & Deta Hedman 4 - 2  Eila Nikander & Paivi Jussila 
 Tammy Montgomery & Deta Hedman 4 - 1  Maureen Owens & Sharon Rafter
 Tammy Montgomery & Deta Hedman 4 - 0  Xeni Koutika & Yiota Kouranou
 Tammy Montgomery & Deta Hedman 4 - 0  Kveta Drahuska & Eva Hrinova 
 Eila Nikander & Paivi Jussila 4 - 0  Maureen Owens & Sharon Rafter
 Eila Nikander & Paivi Jussila 4 - 0  Xeni Koutika & Yiota Kouranou
 Eila Nikander & Paivi Jussila 4 - 0  Kveta Drahuska & Eva Hrinova 
 Maureen Owens & Sharon Rafter 4 - 1  Xeni Koutika & Yiota Kouranou
 Maureen Owens & Sharon Rafter 4 - 1  Kveta Drahuska & Eva Hrinova   
 Xeni Koutika & Yiota Kouranou 4 - 2  Kveta Drahuska & Eva Hrinova

Knock Out

References

Darts tournaments